The Dagger of Malaya is a 1919 German silent crime film directed by Léo Lasko and starring Carl Auen, Bernhard Goetzke, and Victor Janson. It is part of the Joe Deebs detective series films.

The film's sets were designed by the art director Kurt Richter.

Cast

References

Bibliography

External links

1919 films
Films of the Weimar Republic
German silent feature films
Films directed by Léo Lasko
1919 crime films
German crime films
UFA GmbH films
German black-and-white films
1910s German films